Vinícius Lopes Righi, known as Vinícius (born 29 February 1964) is a former Brazilian football player.

He played 7 seasons and 155 games, scoring 40 goals in the Primeira Liga, mostly for Braga and also for Tirsense.

Club career
He made his Primeira Liga debut for Braga on 22 February 1987 as a late substitute in a 0–0 draw against Académica de Coimbra.

References

1964 births
Sportspeople from Rio de Janeiro (state)
Living people
Brazilian footballers
CR Flamengo footballers
S.C. Braga players
Brazilian expatriate footballers
Expatriate footballers in Portugal
Primeira Liga players
F.C. Tirsense players
G.D. Chaves players
Liga Portugal 2 players
Leça F.C. players
Esporte Clube Democrata players
Ypiranga Futebol Clube players
Club Bolívar players
Expatriate footballers in Bolivia
Association football forwards
People from Três Rios